Ringo and His Golden Pistol is a 1966 Italian Spaghetti Western film directed by Sergio Corbucci and starring Mark Damon.

Synopsis
Renamed to cash in on the success of Duccio Tessari’s Ringo movies, Ringo and His Golden Pistol focuses on bounty hunter Johnny Oro/Ringo who sees killing as purely business; in fact he will not draw his solid gold pistol unless he can profit from it and this gets him into trouble. He lets Juanito Perez live because there is nothing to gain from killing a man without a price on his head, unlike his brothers, who "Ringo" does kill. Perez swears revenge and faces off with "Ringo". Juanito has formed an alliance with the local Indian chief and is now prepared for an all-out war against the peaceful town and sheriff that are protecting "Ringo".

Cast
 Mark Damon as Jonathan Tomadaro Jefferson Gonzales ("Johnny Oro"/"Johnny Ringo")
 Valeria Fabrizi as Margie
 Franco De Rosa (as Franco Derosa) as Juanito Perez 
 Ettore Manni as Sheriff Bill Norton
 Giulia Rubini as Jane Norton
 Loris Loddi as Stan Norton
 Andrea Aureli as Gilmore
 Pippo Starnazza as Matt
 John Bartha as Alcalde Benal
 Vittorio Bonos (as Vittorio Williams Bonos) as Slim Anderson
 Silvana Bacci as Manuela Rodriguez
 Giovanni Cianfriglia as Sebastian
 Lucio De Santis as Carlos Perez
 Ferdinando Poggi as Paco Perez

Release
Johnny Oro was released in Italy on 15 July 1966.

References

External links

Spaghetti Western films
Films directed by Sergio Corbucci
Films scored by Carlo Savina
1966 films
1966 Western (genre) films
1960s Italian films